The 1933–34 Michigan Wolverines men's basketball team represented the University of Michigan in intercollegiate basketball during the 1933–34 season.  The team compiled a 6–14 record and 4–8 against Big Ten Conference opponents.  The team finished in a tie for eighth place in the Big Ten.

Franklin Cappon was in his third year as the team's head coach.  Fred Petoskey was the team captain, and Alfred Plummer was the team's leading scorer with 84 points in 20 games for an average of 4.2 points per game.

Scoring statistics

References

Michigan
Michigan Wolverines men's basketball seasons
Michigan Wolverines basketball
Michigan Wolverines basketball